Elena Seregina (born 30 December 2001) is a Russian short track speed skater. She competed at the 2022 Winter Olympics, in Women's 500 metres.

References 

2001 births
Living people
Russian female short track speed skaters
Short track speed skaters at the 2022 Winter Olympics
Olympic short track speed skaters of Russia
21st-century Russian women